Agios Andronikos ( "Saint Andronicus" or  (diminutive of Andronikos, used in distinguishing it from Agios Andronikos);  "village of cannoneers") is a Turkish Cypriot village in Cyprus, located 7 km north of Trikomo. It is under the de facto control of Northern Cyprus.

References

Communities in Famagusta District
Populated places in İskele District